.fo is the country code top-level domain (ccTLD) for the Faroe Islands.

History

The .fo domain was operated by UNI-C, the Danish University Network organisation until June 1997.  It then passed under the control of Tele2 DK, who had bought the activities of UNI-C as part of a privatisation.

In July 1998, the operation was handed to nic.fo as a gesture of good will, and recognition that .fo was indeed Faroese.

Registration rules

 Type A registrations must respond to a trademark of the registrant.
 Type B registrations are possible if you do not hold a matching trademark. Any entity which owns the corresponding trademark can file an opposition within 20 days after the domain registration and be awarded the concerned domain name itself.

References

External links
.fo domain registration website
IANA .fo whois information

Country code top-level domains
Communications in the Faroe Islands
1993 establishments in Denmark
Council of European National Top Level Domain Registries members
Computer-related introductions in 1993

sv:Toppdomän#F